Hu Liu (a/k/a Tiger Liu; born July 6, 1961, in Xining, Qinghai, China) is a retired FIFA referee and the current Canadian Soccer Association's Director of Referees.

References

1961 births
Living people
Canadian soccer referees
CONCACAF Champions League referees
People from Xining
Chinese emigrants to Canada